The 1991–92 Indiana Hoosiers men's basketball team represented Indiana University. Their head coach was Bobby Knight, who was in his 21st year. The team played its home games in Assembly Hall in Bloomington, Indiana, and was a member of the Big Ten Conference.

The Hoosiers finished the regular season with an overall record of 27–7 and a conference record of 14–4, finishing 2nd in the Big Ten Conference. The Hoosiers were invited to participate in the 1992 NCAA tournament as a 2-seed, where IU advanced to the Final Four.

Roster

Schedule/Results

|-
!colspan=8 style=| Regular Season
|-

|-
!colspan=8 style=| NCAA tournament

Rankings

References

Indiana Hoosiers men's basketball seasons
Indiana
NCAA Division I men's basketball tournament Final Four seasons
Indiana
1991 in sports in Indiana
1992 in sports in Indiana